References to the fictional kraken are found in film, literature, television, and other popular culture forms.

Comics
In various comics, particularly DC and Marvel Comics, multiple creatures have been named Kraken.

The Kraken from The Umbrella Academy was named so after the kraken (sea monster) as he has the ability to breathe under water.

In the Disney comic series "Tamers of Nonhuman Threats", the Kraken appears in the fifth story, "Let's Get Kraken". In this story, the Kraken has a natural enemy, the sperm whale.

The kraken is an aquatic monster that has appeared in many comics publications.

A Kraken was featured in the story "The Kraken" in issue #49 of Adventures into the Unknown by  ACG in 1953.

Champion Comics #5 (March 1940, Harvey Comics), Monster Hunters #10 (Oct. 1977, Charlton Comics), Indiana Jones and the Sargasso Pirates #2 (Jan. 1996, Dark Horse Comics), and the Japanese comic, One Piece (ワンピース Wan Pīsu) #62 (November 15, 2010, Shueisha) all featured versions of the Kraken.

Two one-shot publications featured characters bearing the name: a villain called "Dr. Kraken" in Web-Man #1 (1993, Argosy Communications Inc.) and a hero called Diego Hargreeves with the alias "Kraken" in Umbrella Academy #1 (2007, Dark Horse Comics). 2000 AD #583, (July 1988, Fleetway Publications) also featured the debut of a character called Judge Kraken. In Japanese comics, a servant of Poseidon and one of the main antagonists of the second saga of the Saint Seiya manga series. He was called Kraken Isaac (クラーケンのアイザック, Kurāken no Aizakku) - a former childhood friend and fellow saint trainee of main character Cygnus Hyoga -, and debuted in volume 16, published in 1989 by Shueisha.

The web comic "Angry Faerie" (from July 13, 2012), featured a bodybuilder type character called the Kraken.

A Kraken (dispatched by the God Poseidon) appears in the Avatar Press comic God is Dead #48.

A Kraken (depicted as a huge tentacled reptilian monstrosity) is sent to attack the heroes in Grimm Fairy Tales #123 and #124.

A Kraken appears in Broken Moon: Legends of the Deep #1 by American Gothic Press.

A character called "Kid Kraken" appeared in the Dynamite Comics series The Green Hornet 66' meets The Spirit.

DC Comics
Three versions appeared during the Golden Age of Comic Books: the first in Adventure Comics #56 (Nov. 1940), a second, land-based version existing on the planet Venus in Flash Comics #81 (March 1947) and a third variation capable of speech that claimed to be the actual Kraken from ancient folklore who battled the hero Captain Marvel in Whiz Comics #155 (June 1953).

Two versions appeared during the Silver Age of Comic Books: a giant octopus encountered by the Challengers of the Unknown in Showcase #12 (Jan.-Feb 1958), and the second being a giant squid summoned by the hero Aquaman in Aquaman #34 (July-Aug. 1967). Wonder Woman #247 (Sept. 1978) and #289 (March 1982) featured additional versions, and in Wonder Woman vol. 2 #75 (June 1993) the character encountered a version complete with tiara in a dream dimension. In Aquaman #1,000,000 (Nov. 1998), the eponymous hero of the title encounters one of the "Krakens of Vexjor", a race of huge tentacled reptilian sea monsters that inhabit Earth's oceans in the 853rd Century. Wonder Woman and Aquaman also encounter a young Kraken in Issue #1 (Aug. 2011, DC Comics) of the limited series Flashpoint: Wonder Woman and the Furies.

In the 2016 series DC Bombshells, King Nereus took the form of a Kraken to battle the heroines of the story. He's eventually dispatched by Aqua-Woman.

Marvel Comics
Two types of "Krakens" appear in the world of Marvel Comics, one based on the sea monster and the second as a costumed identity used by several individuals. The former first appeared The Avengers #27 (April 1966, Marvel Comics), and several variations of it have appeared in Marvel continuity since. The latter is used as the codename for a high-ranking member of HYDRA, with Daniel Whitehall and Jake Fury having assumed the identity throughout Marvel Comics' run.

Film
 In silent films of the 1910s and 1920s, the Kraken was often portrayed using stock footage of an octopus in a bathtub attacking a toy ship. This footage first appeared in Georges Méliès' 1906 film Under the Seas and was recycled in many other films.
 The Kraken appears in the film Clash of the Titans (1981) as a giant, four-armed humanoid with scales and a fishtail; it is said to be "the last of the Titans".
 In the 2010 version of Clash of the Titans (2010), the Kraken is again featured as a weapon of the Olympian gods. This version of the creature has a humanoid head, torso and arms but also boasts a number of tentacles. Instead of a tail, he is depicted with crab-like legs. He is given a new backstory as the creation of Hades that was used to overthrow the Titans, and was later used by Hades to get revenge on Zeus for tricking him into the underworld. "Release the kraken", as said by Liam Neeson's Zeus, has become an Internet meme.
 The Kraken from Clash of the Titans makes an appearance in The Lego Batman Movie.
 Even though it is not the kraken, a giant octopus menaces ships and eventually the city of San Francisco in the Ray Harryhausen film It Came from Beneath the Sea.
 The Kraken appears in Jack the Giant Killer (1962).
 The Kraken appears in Atlantis: Milo's Return (2003), where it is shown to be telepathic.
 A telemovie called Kraken: Tentacles of the Deep (2006) features the Kraken as its main antagonist.
 In the film Pirates of the Caribbean: Dead Man's Chest (2006), the Kraken is an enormous cephalopod-like sea monster. It does the bidding of Davy Jones by pursuing the souls of men who bear the black spot, a mark that appears on men who are overdue on their debt to Jones. It appears in Pirates of the Caribbean: At World's End, where it has been beached and killed.
 The Kraken makes an appearance  in the 2018 animated film Hotel Transylvania 3: Summer Vacation voiced by Joe Jonas. He sings to the other monsters on the vacation to Atlantis, and he later gets brainwashed by Van Helsing in the climax to attack the monsters. Jonathan eventually breaks the Kraken out of his brainwashed state by playing Macarena.
 In Return to Neverland, the octopus which replaced the crocodile in the first movie is most likely based on the kraken.
 In the Legendary Pictures’ MonsterVerse series, The Kraken is one on the 17 Titans awoken by King Ghidorah in the 2019 film Godzilla: King of the Monsters, it is also known as Na Kika It also makes a appearance in the 2021 graphic novel Godzilla Dominion where it is captured by poachers until Godzilla frees it.
 The lead protagonist in the upcoming 2023 animated film Ruby Gillman, Teenage Kraken is Ruby Gillman, who is a sixteen-year-old teenage kraken.
 The three-part Christian cartoon series Kingdom Under The Sea, produced by Spot Films, later on Vídeo Brinquedo, the main villain is a giant octopus covered in shadows named "Kraken". In the Brazilian dub, he is only referred to as "O Monstro (The Monster)".

Literature 
 Alfred Tennyson 1830 irregular sonnet The Kraken, which described a massive creature that dwelled at the bottom of the sea.
 In Herman Melville's 1851 novel Moby Dick (chapter 59) the crew of the Pequod encounter a "vast pulpy mass, furlongs in length". Starbuck calls it 'The great live squid, which, they say, few whale-ships ever beheld, and returned to their ports to tell of it.' Narrator Ishmael attributes this to Bishop Pontopiddan's "the great Kraken," and concludes: "By some naturalists who have vaguely heard rumors of the mysterious creature, here spoken of, it is included among the class of cuttle-fish, to which, indeed, in certain external respects it would seem to belong, but only as the Anak of the tribe."
 In Victor Hugo's 1866 novel Toilers of the Sea, Gilliatt kills a giant octopus with a knife. "This monster is the creature that seamen call the octopus, scientists call a cephalopod, and which in legend is known as a kraken." 
 Jules Verne's 1870 novel Twenty Thousand Leagues Under the Sea mentions the kraken and features a group of giant squids that attack the submarine Nautilus.
 In Anatole France's 1908 novel L'île des Pingouins (chapter V), Kraken is the name of a character that plays a monster, depicted as, among others, a dragon.
 H. P. Lovecraft's novel The Call of Cthulhu, written in 1926, according to Cthulhu Mythos scholar Robert M. Price, has been inspired by Alfred Tennyson's sonnet. Both reference a huge aquatic creature sleeping for an eternity at the bottom of the ocean and destined to emerge from his slumber in an apocalyptic age.
 John Wyndham's 1953 novel The Kraken Wakes features the sonnet written by Alfred Tennyson called The Kraken (1830), which described a massive creature that dwelled at the bottom of the sea; the story itself refers to an invasion by sea-dwelling aliens. The title is a play on Tennyson's line "The Kraken sleepeth".
 Jack Vance's 1966 science fiction adventure novel The Blue World, based on an earlier 1964 novella The Kragen, depicts a world where natives must beware the kragen, giant, semi-intelligent squid-like predators which roam the ocean.
 In Richard Adams' 1980 novel The Girl in a Swing, the main female character is stalked by the Kraken to punish her for the crime of murder by drowning.
 Terry Brooks' 1985 novel The Wishsong of Shannara features a Kraken as a giant sea creature summoned by "dark magic" to join an assault on a Dwarf fortress.
 In the children's book Monster Mission (also known as Island of the Aunts) by Eva Ibbotson, the Kraken is a force for good who has the ability to clean and heal the oceans.
 The Kraken's appearance at the end of times is implied in the 1990s novel Good Omens by the demon Crowley “Great big bugger […] sleepeth beneath the thunders of the upper deep. Under loads of huge and unnumbered polypol — polipo — bloody great seaweeds, you know. Supposed to rise right at the end, when the sea boils”.
 Kraken appear in Artemis Fowl: The Time Paradox as enormous, peaceful creatures that stay in the same spot for centuries feeding on algae, doubling as islands. They are described as being conical in shape, although there is a tubular shaped one on the coast of Ireland. In this book, Kraken shed their shells explosively, igniting a layer of methane under the old one and sending it flying. A comparison is made between the Kraken, and a barnacle (albeit one big enough to be mistaken for an island).
 In Ken MacLeod's trilogy Engines of Lights (Cosmonaut Keep, Dark Light, Engine City), the giant squids or kraken are one of the five intelligent species from Earth that colonized the Galaxy, the others being one species of saurs and three species of hominidae, including the Homo sapiens. The krakens are the most intelligent of the space colonizers, and the ones who created the technology which made interstellar travels possible,
 In Michael Crichton's posthumous 2009 novel Pirate Latitudes the sailors call the large sea creature that terrorizes the protagonist's ship "the kraken".
 China Miéville's 2010 novel Kraken features a cult devoted to the worship of the creature.
In the A Song of Ice and Fire saga, by George R. R. Martin, the sigil of House Greyjoy of Pyke is a golden kraken. Krakens are also said to be stirring in the wake of the War of Five Kings, drawn by blood in the waters.
In J.R.R. Tolkien's The Lord of the Rings trilogy, the Watcher in the Water which guards the west gate of the abandoned dwarf kingdom of Moria is a Kraken-like creature.
In Dead on the Water by Hailey Edwards, a kraken is living in one of the Wink Sinks in Wink, TX.

Music
"Kraken" is a song by filk songwriter Leslie Fish, based partly on the Tennyson sonnet.
"Kraken" Is a song by Knife Party featured on their 2015 EP, Trigger Warning.
"Release the Kraken" is a song by Ninja Sex Party about a comedically harmless Kraken featured on their 2018 album Cool Patrol.

Sports 

 Greg Hardy, defensive end for the Carolina Panthers, is called "The Kraken" by himself and his fans.
 Filipino basketball player June Mar Fajardo of the San Miguel Beermen is often called the "Kraken" during broadcasts of Philippine Basketball Association games and the Philippines men's national basketball team. The term was first used in 2010 by members at the forum Interbasket.net.
New York Yankees catcher Gary Sanchez has been referred to as the Kraken (often stylized as kRAKEn) since joining the team in 2016.
The Mazatlán F.C. football stadium in Mexico is nicknamed El Kraken.
 The Seattle Kraken are a National Hockey League (NHL) expansion team based in Seattle, Washington.

TV 
 The Hakken-Kraks, sea monsters that live in a pond in the vicinity of Whoville, appear in the 1977 television special Halloween Is Grinch Night and draw their name from the kraken (their heads and long necks, the only parts of their bodies ever seen, more closely resemble sea dragons).
The Australian television series Shaun Micallef's Mad as Hell has a kraken character (Michael Ward) who emerges from a closet on the set when the character Sir Bobo Gargle (Francis Greenslade) announces his intention to 'release the kraken!' The kraken's appearance is accompanied by Toni Basil's 1981 song "Mickey".
 The Big Bang Theory character Sheldon Cooper  mentions krakens in the episodes, "Release the Kraken" and "The Date Night Variable"; in "The Hofstadter Insufficiency", Sheldon dreams of Leonard being grabbed by a kraken and pulled off the research ship he was on.
 The television series Voyage to the Bottom of the Sea featured an episode called "The Village of Guilt" (1964), in which a failed experiment creates a giant octopus that terrorizes the population of a Norwegian fjord.
 In a 2015 commercial for the U.S. insurer, GEICO, a "kraken" emerges from a golf course water hazard during a televised tournament, its tentacles writhing and grasping a golfer and his caddy, as the commentators intone with characteristic understatement that the sea monster looks like a kraken.
 The kraken appears in an episode of Lost Tapes called "Kraken".
 The sixth-season episode "A Wondrous Place" of the ABC series Once Upon a Time features a kraken, which attacks Aladdin and Jasmine. It is during this episode that Captain Nemo explains that kraken blood can open portals to other realms, which Captain Hook requires to return to Storybrooke.
 The Kraken is featured imprisoned by magic in the deep sea, guarded by magician whales, in The Magicians season 5 episode 6 ("Oops!...I Did It Again"). Its release triggers a time loop, similar to Groundhog Day (film).
 The Kraken makes a brief appearance in an episode of Family Guy called "Fighting Irish" when Peter Griffin thanked him for previous aid.
 The Kraken appears in New Looney Tunes
 The Kraken is explicitly mentioned in the Mickey Mouse episode "Wonders of the Deep," a giant squid subsequently appears and attacks Mickey and Donald while they're looking for Ludwig Von Drake.
 The Kraken appears as a false flashback in Our Flag Means Death as the monster which killed Blackbeard's father. It is later revealed that it was in fact Blackbeard killing his own father, saying "I am the Kraken".

Video games
 Age of Mythology (2002)
Battlefield 1 (2016): In the Turning Tides DLC, the Royal Marines assault trooper has a tattoo of a Kraken on his left arm.
 Call of Duty: Ghosts (2013)
 Conan (2007)
 Darkfall: Unholy Wars (2013)
 Darkfall Online (2009)
 Donkey Kong Country Returns (2010)
 EarthBound (1994): Does not resemble a giant squid but is instead a large, green snake with red hair that breathes fire.
Evolve (2015): One of the monster classes is named Kraken.
 Fable: The Lost Chapters (2004)
 Final Fantasy (1987)<ref

name="FFI"></ref>
 Final Fantasy ARR (2012)
 Forge of Empires added Kraken to the Oceanic Future age in 2017
 God of War II  (2007) Set in the world Greek mythology, the Kraken is the final barrier between the player character Kratos and the temple of the Fates
Gods Of Olympus- It is associated with the God Poseidon
 Golden Sun (2001)
 Grandia (1997)
 Heroes of Newerth (2010)
Hitman (2016): the second episode (Sapienza) contains a redacted challenge called Unleash the Kraken in which a sailing boat is consumed by a sea monster.
 Indiana Jones and the Emperor's Tomb (2003): the 7th and last level in Istanbul "The Kraken´s Lair". This level is a boss-fight level.
Kerbal Space Program (2015): A floating-point bug in this space flight simulator which caused vessels at high speed and/or far away places to be disassembled and destroyed was named "Space Kraken" by the community. This name was adopted by the developers, who named the fix for this bug "Krakensbane". Various other game-breaking or ship-destroying glitches have since been found, which are also referred to as the Kraken.
 Kid Icarus: Uprising (2012) features a space kraken.
 Marvel: Ultimate Alliance (2006)
 Old School RuneScape (2013): the Kraken is featured as a boss
 One Piece: Grand Cruise (2018) features the crew taking on a kraken.
 Return of the Obra Dinn (2018)
Risen 2 (2012)
 Sea of Thieves features the Kraken as an enemy which attacks player ships. (2018)
 Secrets of the Deep for Pinball FX 2 (2011)
 Shamu's Deep Sea Adventures (2005)
 Shining Force II (1993)
SimplePlanes (2014)
Donkey Kong Country: Tropical Freeze (2014)
Smite (2013): Kraken is the name of Poseidon's ultimate ability (despite Poseidon being a Greek god and the Kraken being associated with the Norse). A game achievement involving this ability was called "Release the Kraken"
Splatoon (2015): the Kraken is a special weapon obtainable in a match that allows the player to temporarily become a giant squid and move with reduced speed and impunity across the map. This special was not present in Splatoon 2 (2017), but a reworked version called the Kraken Royale was added to the 3.0 update of Splatoon 3 (2022).
Splatoon Series (2015-2022): Throughout all three games in the Splatoon series, the English translation has featured a brand named Krak-On, a variant on the word kraken. In the original Japanese, this connection is not present.
 The Ocean Hunter (1998)
 Return of the Obra Dinn (2018): A Kraken is seen in the 7th chapter of the story, the Doom, summoned by mermaids to return a sacred shell that was stolen by the Obra Dinn's crew, killing many of them in the process. 
 The Sims 3: Island Paradise (2013)
 The Sinking City (2019)
 Tomb Raider: Underworld (2008)
 Vainglory (video game) (2014)
 Wonder Boy in Monster Land (1987): Kraken is a boss monster: a blue giant squid that floats.
 World of Warcraft (2004)
 World of Warships (2015): One of the in-game achievements is named Kraken Unleashed, and is awarded to players who destroy 5 or more ships in a single battle.
 Zeus: Master of Olympus (2000): The Kraken appears as both an enemy, and a friendly, monster in some campaign missions. It can be unleashed by Poseidon for those missions where Poseidon is an opponent god (it will appear in water ways, essentially blocking trade), but where the player can build a Sanctuary to Poseidon, it will defend the player's city from attack.
 Wizard101 (2008-): The Kraken is a boss as well as a spell and pet in the game.

Miscellaneous
 In Greek mythology, Perseus defeats a monster called Ceto, represented by the constellation of Cetus (usually depicted as a whale, whose systematic name is Cetacean, also deriving from Ceto).
 A set of four postage stamps displaying legendary Canadian animals was released in 1990. One stamp in the set featured the kraken.
 Magic: The Gathering features the kraken as a creature type.  Alongside their aquatic brethren leviathans, krakens are typically among the largest creatures available to summon with blue mana.
 Dungeons and Dragons features the kraken as an end-game challenge boss.
 Kraken was the name of a marine biological supply house in the United Kingdom from 1968 to 1978. A historical website exists .
 The Kraken is a steel floorless roller coaster manufactured by Bolliger & Mabillard. It opened in 2000 and is located at SeaWorld Orlando, in the United States.
 The Kraken Rum is a 94 proof rum manufactured in Trinidad and Tobago; it was released in the United States in 2009.
 The Cassini probe has detected a huge body of liquid on Titan, Saturn's largest moon. It has since been named the Kraken Mare.
The Razer Kraken is a gaming/music headphone range created by Razer Inc.
"Kraken" is a modern make of twin-hose regulator for scuba diving.
  Attorney Sidney Powell referred to releasing supposed evidence of  widespread fraud in the 2020 U.S. Presidential Election as "[releasing] the Kraken," inspiring a wave of memes and criticism.
 In Monster High, Kala Mer'ri is the daughter of the Kraken, although she keeps her heritage a secret.

See also
 Cetus (mythology)
 Colossal squid
 Giant squid
 Giant squid in popular culture
 Lusca, colossal octopus
 Sea monster
 Seattle Kraken

References

External links
 The Kraken: radio drama by Frederick Engelhardt (L. Ron Hubbard).
 Reflections: The Kraken by Robert Silverberg.

 
British poems